Mukim Kampung Bahru or Kampong Bahru (also known as Mukim 10) is a mukim (Malay for subdistrict) located in Batu Pahat District in Johor, Malaysia. Batu Pahat District was divided into 14 mukims, each of which encompasses several villages. The population was 11,997 in 2010. The majority ethics of the population in the Kampung Bahru is Malay (9,286).

Villages 
Kampung Bahru comprises the following populated village, among them are:

 Kampung Bahru
 Kampung Sungai Kalung
 Kampung Sungai Buloh
 Kampung Parit Botak
 Kampung Parit Hitam
 Kampung Parit Kalong Gantung Laut
 Kampung Parit Kalong Gantung Darat
 Kampung Parit Bakong
 Kampung Parit Hamit
 Kampung Mahang Laut
 Kampung Makmor
 Kampung Seri Menanti Laut
 Kampung Lapis Sri Dalam
 Kampung Lapis Mahang

References 

Mukims of Batu Pahat District